Gonzalo Maldonado Lostaunau (born 18 May 1994) is a Peruvian footballer who plays as a striker for Universitario.

External links 
 

1994 births
Living people
Association football forwards
Peruvian footballers
Club Universitario de Deportes footballers
Peruvian Primera División players
Footballers at the 2015 Pan American Games
Pan American Games competitors for Peru
21st-century Peruvian people